The 1995–96 season of the Venezuelan Primera División, the top category of Venezuelan football, was played by 12 teams. The national champions were Minervén.

Torneo Apertura

Group Oriental

Group Occidental

Final

|}

Torneo Clausura

Group A

Group B

Final Stage

External links
Venezuela 1995 season at RSSSF

Venezuelan Primera División seasons
Ven
Ven
1995–96 in Venezuelan football